Lin Zushen is a Chinese wrestler. He is competing in the 2020 Summer Olympics.

References

External links
 

Living people
1994 births
Chinese male sport wrestlers
Wrestlers at the 2020 Summer Olympics
Olympic wrestlers of China
21st-century Chinese people